} is a railway station in the city of Tsuchiura, Ibaraki Prefecture, Japan, operated by East Japan Railway Company (JR East). It is also a freight depot for the Japan Freight Railway Company (JR Freight).

Lines

Station layout
The station consists of one side platform and one island platform, connected to the station building by a footbridge. The station is staffed. Two local trains stop approximately every hour during the day.

Platforms

History
Kandatsu Station was opened on 4 November 1895. The station was absorbed into the JR East network upon the privatization of the Japanese National Railways (JNR) on 1 April 1987.

Passenger statistics
In fiscal 2019, the station was used by an average of 5,572  passengers daily (boarding passengers only).

Surrounding area
Kandatsu Post Office
Kandatsu Industrial Park

See also
 List of railway stations in Japan

References

External links

  Station information JR East Station Information 

Railway stations in Ibaraki Prefecture
Jōban Line
Railway stations in Japan opened in 1895
Tsuchiura
Stations of Japan Freight Railway Company